Boruty may refer to the following places:
Boruty, Grójec County in Masovian Voivodeship (east-central Poland)
Boruty, Gmina Rzewnie in Masovian Voivodeship (east-central Poland)
Boruty, Gmina Sypniewo in Masovian Voivodeship (east-central Poland)